Erminio is a male Italian given name. Notable people with the name include:
Erminio Asin (born 1914), Italian footballer
Erminio Azzaro (born 1948), Italian high jumper
Erminio Blotta (1892–1976), Argentine–Italian sculptor
Erminio Bolzan (1914–1993), Italian boxer
Erminio Boso (1945–2019), Italian politician
Erminio Criscione (1954/1955–1992), Italian emigrant and perpetrator of the Lugano District shootings
Erminio Confortola (1901–1934), Italian skier and mountain guide
Erminio Costa (1924–2009), Italian–American neuroscientist
Erminio Dones (1887–1945), Italian rower
Erminio Favalli (1944–2008), Italian footballer
Erminio Frasca (born 1983), Italian sport shooter
Erminio Macario (1902–1980), Italian film actor and comedian
Erminio Piserchia (born 1964), Italian footballer
Erminio Rullo (born 1984), Italian footballer
Erminio Salvederi, Italian guitarist, member of the band Dik Dik
Erminio Sertorelli (1901–1979), Italian cross–country skier
Erminio Sipari (1879–1968), Italian politician and naturalist
Erminio Spalla (1897–1971), Italian boxer
Erminio Suárez (born 1969), Argentine track cyclist
Erminio Valenti (1564–1618), Italian Roman Catholic cardinal

See also
Herminio, Portuguese and Spanish equivalent
A.S. Giana Erminio, an Italian football club based in Gorgonzola, Lombardy

Italian masculine given names